CHAT-FM is a Canadian radio station that broadcasts a country format at 94.5 FM in Medicine Hat, Alberta. The station is owned by the Jim Pattison Group.

History 
The station originally began broadcasting as an AM station on November 1, 1946 at 1270 kHz, where it remained until the station moved to 94.5 FM in 2006. It was a network affiliate of CBC Radio's Dominion Network until 1962 when the network dissolved. It then became an affiliate of the main CBC Radio network and remained so until 1994 when CBC built a repeater of CBR for the Medicine Hat area.

In October 2022, the station rebranded as Wild 94.5, taking its name from Calgary sister station CKWD-FM.

Notable people
Jurgen Gothe, who later became a prominent national broadcaster on CBC Radio 2, got his start as an advertising copywriter for the station. Doug McArthur, accomplished news broadcaster, was a linchpin of the radio news department throughout the 1980s.

References

External links
Wild 94.5
 
 

Hat
Hat
Hat
Radio stations established in 1946
1946 establishments in Alberta
HAT